Charlesworth is a neighbourhood in southeast Edmonton, Alberta, Canada.  
It is bounded on the south by Ellerslie Road, on the west by 66 Street, and on the east by 34 Street and on the north by Anthony Henday Drive.

As of December 23, 2007, the City of Edmonton map utility contained virtually no data on this area. As this area develops, more data should become available.

Demographics 

Surrounding neighbourhoods

References 

Neighbourhoods in Edmonton